Xiangyang East railway station is a railway station located in Xiangzhou District, Xiangyang, China.

History
The station opened with the first stage of the Wuhan–Shiyan high-speed railway. Subsequently, on 1 December, the station became an interchange with the opening of the first stage of the Zhengzhou–Wanzhou high-speed railway.

The planned Xiangyang–Jingmen high-speed railway and the Xiangyang–Guiyang high-speed railway will start at this station.

References

Railway stations in Hubei
Railway stations in China opened in 2019